The 2012 Women's Water Polo Olympic Qualification Tournament was held at the Polo Natatorio Bruno Bianchi in Trieste, Italy, from 15 to 22 April 2012.

Participants

There were 12 places originally allocated to continental associations in the tournament not already directly qualified to the Olympics – 5 from Europe, 3 from the Americas, 2 from Asia, 1 from Africa, and 1 from Oceania.

Italy qualified from Europe as host country. Greece, Hungary, Russia and Spain qualified from the 2012 European Water Polo Championships and confirmed their attendance at the tournament. Canada, Brazil and Cuba qualified from the 2011 Pan American Games, Canada and Brazil confirmed their attendance, but Cuba declined to participate and no other teams from the 2011 Pan American Games volunteered to take their place. Kazakhstan and Japan qualified from the 2012 Asian Water Polo Championship, Kazakhstan confirmed their attendance, but Japan declined to participate and there were no other nations entered in the 2012 Asian Water Polo Championship to take their place. There was an article written by a FINA press correspondent in Japan showing confusion around the qualification procedure from the Asian Championship, as the article states that the winners of the Asian Championship had advanced to this qualification tournament (in fact, they qualified directly for the Olympics) and that Japan could no longer get to the Olympics (in fact, according to FINA By-Laws, they were eligible for this tournament, and they did not apply).

No teams from Africa or Oceania applied to participate in the qualification tournament. The next highest placed teams from the other continents were invited to take the four available places (one each from the Americas, Asia, Africa and Oceania), in the following rotation:

 Host continent (Europe)
 Americas
 Asia
 Europe
 Oceania
 Africa

As there were no remaining American, Asian, Oceanic, nor African teams making themselves available for selection, the available places were offered to the teams in the 2012 European Water Polo Championships that were not already either qualified for the Olympics or already in this tournament. Only the Netherlands accepted. The qualification tournament, designed as a 12-team tournament, therefore had only 9 entries.

Draw

The draw took place on 19 February 2012 at 12:00 at the Crowne Plaza, London Docklands. There were originally to be six teams in each preliminary round group. However, with the low number of entries for this tournament, there was one group of four teams and one group of five teams. Each team was taken from a draw line of two teams based on their results, first in the last World 
Championships, then by their last continental championships.

After being drawn into Group A and B, the teams drew numbers from 1 to 5 to determine the order of matches.

Preliminary round
All times are local (UTC+2)

Group A

Group B

Final phase 
All times are local (UTC+2)

Bracket

5th-8th place bracket

Quarterfinal round
The winners in the quarterfinal round qualify for the 2012 Olympic Games water polo tournament.

Semifinal round

5th-8th classification semifinals

1st-4th classification semifinals

Final round

7th-8th place

5th-6th place

Bronze medal game

Gold medal game

Final ranking

See also
2012 Men's Water Polo Olympic Games Qualification Tournament

References 

Qualification Tournament, women
2012
Olymp